SDV Barneveld, sometimes shortened to SDVB, is a football club from Barneveld, Netherlands. SDV Barneveld plays in the 2017–18 Saturday Eerste Klasse after relegating in 2017 from the Hoofdklasse.

References

External links
 Official site

Football clubs in the Netherlands
Football clubs in Gelderland
Sport in Barneveld
Association football clubs established in 1954
1954 establishments in the Netherlands